The 4th Artillery Berlin Red Banner Breakthrough Corps of the RGK — (4 акп РГК) was a military formation, artillery breakthrough corps Reserve of the Supreme High Command of the Red Army during the Second World War.

History 
The 4th Artillery Corps of the Reserve of the Supreme High Command (RVGK) was formed on April 24, 1943, and on the basis of the resolution of the State Defence Committee (GKO) of April 12 1943.

During the war it fought as part of the Central Front; 1st Belorussian Front; and 2nd Belorussian Front. 

The corps' formations, units, and awards included:
 5th Artillery Kalinkovichi Red Banner Breakthrough Division
 6th Artillery Mozyr Order of Lenin Red Banner Breakthrough Division
 12th Artillery Red Banner Orders of Kutuzov and Bogdan Khmelnitsky Breakthrough Division
 5th Guards Mortar Kalinkovichskaya Red Banner, Order of the Suvorov Division
 34th Guards Artillery Perekop Red Banner, Order of the Suvorov Division (after its formation in June-July 1945)
 3rd Guards Anti-tank Artillery Brest-Warsaw, Order of Lenin, Red Banner, Order of Kutuzov Brigade
 4th Guards Anti-Tank Artillery Rechitsko-Radom twice Red Banner Orders of Suvorov, Kutuzov and Bogdan Khmelnitsky Brigade
 20th separate anti-tank artillery Stalingrad-Rechitsa Red Banner Orders of Suvorov and Kutuzov Brigade
 1002nd Separate Order of the Red Star Signals Battalion
 821st Separate Reconnaissance Artillery Kalinkovichsky Red Banner Orders of Bohdan Khmelnitsky and Alexander Nevsky Division.

On 9 May 1945, at the end of the war in Europe, the corps was made up of the 5th Breakthrough Artillery Division; the 12th Breakthrough Artillery Division; the 5th Guards Mortar Division (multiple rocket launchers); the 1002nd Communications Battalion; the 821st Separate Reconnaissance Artillery Battalion; and the 2355th military postal station.

The 34th Artillery Division was formed within the corps in 1945. By that time the corps was part of the Group of Soviet Forces in Germany. In 1953, the 4th Artillery Corps was disbanded.

References 

 V.I. Feskov et al., The Red Army in victories and defeats 1941-1945, Chapter 5. Artillery of the Red Army during the Great Patriotic War, 255-312
 Ministerstva Oborony SSSR, Glavnoye Upravleniye Kadrov, Komandovaniye Korpusnogo I Divizionnogo Zvena Sovetskikh Vooruzhennykh Sil Perioda Velikoy Otechestvennoy Voyny 1941-45gg. [Commanders of Corps and Divisions of the Soviet Armed Forces in the Great Patriotic War], (Moscow: Izdaniye Voyennoy Akademii M.V. Frunze 1964) responsible: A.I. Kalabin. Supplement to the book "Military Personnel of the Soviet State in the Great Patriotic War of 1941-1945."
 The leading political composition of the period of the Great Patriotic War

External links 
 Artillery corps of the breakthrough of the Red Army of the period 1943-1945
 Vikenty Nikitovich MAZUR — short biography.
 
 

Artillery units and formations of the Soviet Union
Corps of the Soviet Union
Military units and formations disestablished in 1953